Roland Eng (born 1959) is a Cambodian politician and ambassador. He has worked diplomatically in Thailand, Malaysia, Singapore, and the United States of America.

Eng was sent to France to pursue his education in 1968. Three years later in 1971, his father disappeared, leaving his mother, five sisters, and two brothers when the Khmer Rouge invaded Cambodia. In 1979, Eng joined King Norodom Sihanouk as private secretary and the following year he graduated with a degree in public administration from Université Paul Cézanne Aix-Marseille III.

Eng's career in the public service commenced during some of the most turbulent times in Cambodia's history. As private secretary to His Majesty King Norodom Sihanouk of Cambodia from 1979 to 1981, he later joined the Royalist movement for more than a decade along the Thai-Cambodian border and actively participated in the making of the Paris Peace Agreement, which established the United Nations Transitional Authority of Cambodia (UNTAC) in 1992. 
Eng participated actively in the Paris Peace Agreement which established UNTAC, the United Nations operation in Cambodia. He was subsequently appointed by His Majesty the King as rotating ambassador of the then-Supreme National Council of Cambodia (SNC) to the United Nations, and later on ran as a candidate for Member of Parliament for Kampot province for the FUNCIPEC party. Eng was Cambodia's first Minister of Tourism in 1992-1993. During his tenure, he modernized and transformed Cambodia's nascent tourism sector, turning its Tourism Authority into a full-fledged Ministry with a clear vision and mandate in developing the country's tourism. He was then appointed as roving ambassador to the UN for the SNC (Supreme National Council of Cambodia).

Eng served as Cambodia's ambassador to the United States from 1999 to 2005. Prior to his posting in Washington D.C., he was ambassador to Thailand with concurrent accreditation to Malaysia and Singapore from 1994 to 1999, where he re-established Cambodia's diplomatic relations with these countries following several years’ hiatus. 

Eng has contributed several articles on development, conflict resolution, and other topics. Among his recent works is “Creating Local-Level Stability and Empowerment in Cambodia” in “Human Security for All: A Tribute to Sergio Vieira de Mello” (Fordham University Press, 2004).

Eng is fluent in Cambodian, French, and English. He is actively involved in various foundations and NGOs and is currently president of the Angkor Photo Festival. He also sits on the advisory board of Anjali House, a Siem Reap-based non-profit organization that provides free food, healthcare, and education to under-privileged children. Eng also serves on the board of directors of Friends of Khmer Culture (FOKCI), Sobbhana Women's Foundation, Jay Pritzker Academy (JPA), and the Angkor Photo Festival.

References

Ambassador Roland Eng, The Little Red Dot Vol III. Lee Kuan Yew School of Public Policy:≤Singapore Cambodia a growing partnership page ≥

Bibliography

 Mehta, Harish C., Warrior Prince: Norodom Ranariddh, Son of King Sihanouk of Cambodia, Graham Brash, 2001, 
Singapore-Cambodia- a growing partnership page 25

1959 births
FUNCINPEC politicians
Living people
Cambodian people of Chinese descent
Cambodian Cham people 
Ambassadors of Cambodia to Malaysia
Ambassadors of Cambodia to Thailand
Ambassadors of Cambodia to Singapore
Ambassadors of Cambodia to the United States